Instituto de Ciencias in Zapopan, Jalisco, Mexico, claims its origin to 1591 when the Jesuits first opened a college in Guadalajara. It was then named St. Thomas Aquinas College, but was closed with the suppression of the Jesuits in 1767. It reopened in 1906 under the name San José College and in 1920, after the Mexican Revolution, was named Instituto de Ciencias de Jalisco, in the metropolitan area of Guadalajara.

See also
 List of Jesuit sites

References  

Jesuit schools in Mexico
High schools in Mexico
Private schools in Mexico
Education in Jalisco